Terry Hutchinson (born May 20, 1968) is an American sailor eleven-time world champion in the Corel 45, J/24, TP 52, Farr 40 and IMS classes, and a winning tactician of the Louis Vuitton Cup. In 2008 and 2014, he was named Rolex Yachtsman of the Year. He has also been part of five America's Cup campaigns.

Background 
He grew up in Annapolis, Maryland and went to St. Mary's High School.

Sailing career

Early
Hutchinson earned first team All-American honors in each of his four years at Old Dominion University, and helped lead the Monarchs to four national championships: Sloop Championship in 1989 and 1990, Coed Dinghy Championship in 1989, and Team Racing Championship in 1990. He received the ICSA College Sailor of the Year award In 1989 and 1990 and was named Old Dominion's alumni Association's Male Athlete of the Year in 1990.

Right afterwards, he won the Key West Race Week in 1990 and 1991 (Class 1 with "Collaboration"); 1992 (Class 2 with "Sensation"); 1994, 1995 and 1996 (Class 2 with "Flash Gordon"); and 1998 (Class 1 with "Bright Star").

In between, he also won the Congressional Cup in 1992, his first World Championship, at the 1995 Corel 45 Worlds with "Titan", and the National Championship in Mumm 36 with "Sandman" in 1997. In 1998, he took his second Worlds in Corel 45 with "Heatwave".

In the J/24 class, he became North American Champion in 1997 and repeated in 1998, when he also won the World Championship, with "Evita".

In 2000, Terry Hutchinson, as helmsman of "Vim", a Nelson/Marek 43 boat owned by Craig Speck, won the Racing Division title in the IMS Offshore World Championship.

Hutchinson went on to win the Farr 40 World Championship in 2014, 2016 and 2017 as tactician on Alex Roeper’s "Plenty", and the Farr 40 North American Championship and the California Cup.

He also won the TP 52 World Championship title in 2008, 2010, 2011, 2014 and 2022 as both helmsman and tactician of Quantum Racing.

He sailed in the 2001–02 Volvo Ocean Race as tactician on Djuice Dragons.

Terry is also famously known for yelling "priority staysail" at top marks prior to kite up and jib down.

World Championship Titles

America Cup
Hutchinson has been a key part of five America’s Cup campaigns (all unsuccessful):
2000 Louis Vuitton Cup, mainsail trimmer for America One
2003 Louis Vuitton Cup, tactician for Stars & Stripes
2007 America's Cup, tactician for Emirates Team New Zealand
2011–13 America's Cup World Series, skipper for Artemis Racing
2021 Prada Cup, skipper and grinder for American Magic (also served as executive director)

References

External links
 

1968 births
Living people
American male sailors (sport)
ICSA College Sailor of the Year
US Sailor of the Year
2003 America's Cup sailors
2000 America's Cup sailors
2007 America's Cup sailors
2021 America's Cup sailors
World champions in sailing for the United States
J/24 class world champions
Farr 40 class world champions
TP52 class world champions
Old Dominion Monarchs sailors
Artemis Racing sailors
Team New Zealand sailors
Volvo Ocean Race sailors
Extreme Sailing Series sailors
American Magic
Sportspeople from Annapolis, Maryland